The Rivière aux Castors Noirs (English: black beaver river) is a tributary of the Batiscan River, flowing in Haute-Batiscanie, in the province of Québec, Canada. This watercourse crosses:
 the unorganized territory of Lac-Croche which is part of the La Jacques-Cartier Regional County Municipality, in the administrative region of Capitale-Nationale;
 the municipality of Lac-Édouard which is part of the La Tuque, in the administrative region of Mauricie.

This river is located entirely in the forest zone in the Laurentides Wildlife Reserve, near its western limit. This hydrographic slope is served by some forest roads.

Forestry is the main economic activity in the sector; recreational activities, second.

The surface of the Black Beaver River (except the rapids areas) is generally frozen from the beginning of December to the end of March, but safe circulation on the ice is generally made from the end of December to the beginning of March. The water level of the river varies with the seasons and the precipitation.

Geography 
The Black Beaver River originates from "Lac à la Poêle" in the unorganized territory of Lac-Croche. This long lake is mainly fed by the outlet of Lac de la Queue, the outlet of Lake Cos, the outlet of Lake Dabin and the outlet of Lake Tretté. Its outfall is located at the bottom of a bay in the northwestern part of the lake.

The course of the river straddles the boundary of the administrative regions of Capitale-Nationale and Mauricie.

The "rivière aux Castors Noirs" flows to the bottom of a bay on the north shore of a lake formed by the widening of the Batiscan River.

Toponymy 
The toponym "Rivière aux Castors Noirs" was formalized on December 5, 1968 in the Place Names Bank of the Commission de toponymie du Québec.

See also 

 La Jacques-Cartier Regional County Municipality
 Lac-Édouard, a municipality
 Lac-Croche, an unorganized territory
 Lac des Trois Caribous
 Lac aux Biscuits
 Laurentides Wildlife Reserve
 Batiscanie
 Batiscan River
 Aberdeen River
 List of rivers of Quebec

Notes and references 

Rivers of Capitale-Nationale
Rivers of Mauricie
La Jacques-Cartier Regional County Municipality
La Tuque, Quebec
Laurentides Wildlife Reserve